is a Shingon Buddhist temple in Fushimi-ku, Kyoto, Japan. Its main devotion (honzon) is Yakushi. Daigo, literally "ghee", is used figuratively to mean "crème de la crème" and is a metaphor of the most profound part of Buddhist thoughts.

History 
Daigo-ji was founded in the early Heian period. In 874, Rigen-daishi (Shōbō) founded the temple.
 
After having fallen ill and abdicated in 930, Emperor Daigo entered Buddhist priesthood at this temple. As a monk, he took the Buddhist name Hō-kongō; and shortly thereafter, died at the age of 46. He was buried in the temple, which is why his posthumous name was Daigo.

During the Muromachi period, the temple was devastated by the Ōnin War, leaving only the five-storied pagoda as the sole surviving structure. Several subsequent reconstruction efforts took place under Hideyoshi Toyotomi, with the last reconstruction being carried out in 1606. These efforts rebuilt much of the current structures, including the Kondō and the Kaisan-dō. 

In 1939, a forest fire struck the Kami-Daigo portion of the temple, burning down the Buddhist Texts Library and the Juntei-dō, which was only rebuilt in 1968. In 1997, the Hokke Sanmaya-do, a hall that had been originally constructed in 949 but was burnt down in 1470, was reconstructed and renamed as the Shinnyo Sanmaya-do.

National treasures 

Several structures, including the kondō and the five-story pagoda, are National Treasures of Japan. The temple possesses 18 specifically designated national treasures, including the buildings and other works as well; and the temple holds several dozen important cultural assets.  Wall paintings at the temple were the subject of academic research which earned the Imperial Prize of the Japan Academy in 1960.

As part of the "Historic Monuments of Ancient Kyoto", it is designated as a World Heritage Site.

The five-storey pagoda at Daigoji temple was built in 951 and is the oldest building in Kyoto. It was one of few buildings to survive the Onin War in the 15th century.

Garden 
More than seven centuries after its founding, Toyotomi Hideyoshi held a famous cherry blossom viewing party called Daigo no hanami in 1598 at the Sambō-in sub-temple.

The bright colors of maple leaves attract tourists and others in the autumn season. Emperor Suzaku's mausoleum, known as Daigo no misasagi, is located near Daigo-ji.

Layout 

Daigo-ji is laid out in three parts: Sambō-in, Shimo-Daigo (Lower Daigo), and Kami-Daigo (Upper Daigo). These are progressively older, wilder, and further up the mountain. Sambō-in and Shimo-Daigo are at the base of the mountain, easily accessible, and attract the most tourism; Kami-Daigo is on top of the mountain, requires a long, strenuous hike to reach, and is accordingly less visited. The streets around Sambō-in can be freely traveled, but entering Sambō-in proper, the museum, Shimo-Daigo, or Kami-Daigo all require separate admission – the first three have combined ticketing, while Kami-Daigo is separate.

Sambō-in is a collection of walled complexes, connected by streets lined with cherry blossoms. It contains the temple proper (including a noted tea garden), a museum, and other complexes, and is very lively during cherry blossom season. Shimo-Daigo is one large enclosure, containing detached halls, including the oldest surviving building in Kyoto, together with open spaces.

Kami-Daigo, other than a small cluster of buildings at the base, is located on top of the mountain. The entrance to Kami-Daigo can be reached by passing through Shimo-Daigo, or by a path beside Shimo-Daigo. There is a path with stairs up to the top, which takes about one hour to reach the main complex; halfway up there is a resting point and small shrine. At the entrance to the main complex is Daigo-Sui, a spring of holy water, which was the origin of Daigo-ji, together with other buildings. Beyond the summit, the back of the mountain is almost completely undeveloped, primarily featuring hiking trails. Due to difficulty reaching, this is rarely visited by tourists, though a temple event is held there on the first Sunday in March.

Events 
On August 24, 2008, the Juntei Kannon-dō at the top of the hill on the east of the temple was struck by lightning and burned down. It stood in the Kami Daigo part of the temple. Kami Daigo is Number 11 in the 33 temples of the Kansai Kannon Pilgrimage. The structure dated from 1968. This resulted in the temporary closure of the upper area (Kami Daigo-ji) for disaster restoration construction, which reopened on July 1, 2009.

See also 
 List of Buddhist temples in Kyoto
 List of National Treasures of Japan (temples)
 List of National Treasures of Japan (ancient documents)
 List of National Treasures of Japan (paintings)
 List of National Treasures of Japan (sculptures)
 List of National Treasures of Japan (writings)
 For an explanation of terms concerning Japanese Buddhism, Japanese Buddhist art, and Japanese Buddhist temple architecture, see the Glossary of Japanese Buddhism.

Notes

References 
 Brown, Delmer and Ichiro Ishida, eds. (1979). [ Jien, 1221], Gukanshō; "The Future and the Past: a translation and study of the 'Gukanshō,' an interpretive history of Japan written in 1219" translated from the Japanese and edited by Delmer M. Brown & Ichirō Ishida. Berkeley: University of California Press.  
 Ponsonby-Fane, Richard Arthur Brabazon. (1956). Kyoto: The Old Capital of Japan, 794-1869. Kyoto: The Ponsonby Memorial Society.
 Titsingh, Isaac. (1834). [Siyun-sai Rin-siyo/Hayashi Gahō, 1652]. Nipon o daï itsi ran; ou, Annales des empereurs du Japon.  Paris: Oriental Translation Society of Great Britain and Ireland.
 Varley, H. Paul , ed. (1980). [Kitabatake Chikafusa, 1359], Jinnō Shōtōki ("A Chronicle of Gods and Sovereigns: Jinnō Shōtōki of Kitabatake Chikafusa" translated by H. Paul Varley). New York: Columbia University Press.

External links
Temple's official website
 http://www.daigoji.or.jp/index_e.html
Daigoji - World History Encyclopedia

874 establishments
9th-century establishments in Japan
Religious organizations established in the 9th century
Buddhist temples in Kyoto
Shingon Buddhism
World Heritage Sites in Japan
National Treasures of Japan
Important Cultural Properties of Japan
Pagodas in Japan
Historic Sites of Japan
Shugendō
Maitreya